David Ames Manson (December 24, 1841 – February 9, 1929) was a Canadian merchant and political figure in Quebec. He represented Brome in the House of Commons of Canada as a Liberal-Conservative member from 1880 to 1882.

He was born in Mansonville, Canada East, the son of Robert Manson, of Scottish descent, and was educated at Knowlton, Stanstead and Waterloo. In 1866, he married Mary Eliza Manson. Manson served as postmaster for Mansonville from 1865 to 1880. He was elected to the House of Commons in an 1880 by-election held after the death of Edmund Leavens Chandler. Manson was a director of the Canadian Agricultural Insurance Company and the Missisquoi and Black River Railway.

References 
 
The Canadian parliamentary companion and annual register, 1881 CH Mackintosh

1841 births
1929 deaths
Members of the House of Commons of Canada from Quebec
Conservative Party of Canada (1867–1942) MPs